The Transports de Martigny et Régions (TMR) company in the Valais canton of Switzerland operates bus and coach services and two electric railway lines:
 Martigny–Châtelard Railway (MC), with the Mont-Blanc Express
 Martigny–Orsières Railway, with the Saint-Bernard Express

The company is the result of merging Martigny–Orsières Railway (MO) and the Martigny–Châtelard Railway (MC)
in 2001 with the official date 2000-01-01 to form the Transports de Martigny et Régions.

References

External links
 

 
Transport companies of Switzerland
Railway companies of Switzerland
2000 establishments in Switzerland
Railway companies established in 2000